Griffin Boyette Bell (October 31, 1918 – January 5, 2009) was the 72nd Attorney General of the United States, having served under President Jimmy Carter. Previously, he was a U.S. circuit judge of the United States Court of Appeals for the Fifth Circuit.

Education and career
Born on October 31, 1918, in Americus, Georgia. He served in the United States Army from 1942 to 1946 in the Quartermaster Corps and Transportation Corps. He was stationed at Fort Lee, Virginia. He attained the rank of major. After leaving the army, Bell received a Bachelor of Laws in 1948 from Mercer University School of Law. He entered private practice in Savannah, Georgia from 1948 to 1952. He was in private practice in Rome, Georgia from 1952 to 1953 and then was in private practice at King & Spalding in Atlanta, Georgia from 1953 to 1961. He was Chief of Staff to Governor Ernest Vandiver from 1959 to 1961.

Federal judicial service
Bell received a recess appointment from President John F. Kennedy on October 5, 1961, to the United States Court of Appeals for the Fifth Circuit, to a new seat authorized by 75 Stat. 80. He was nominated to the same position by President Kennedy on January 15, 1962. He was confirmed by the United States Senate on February 5, 1962, and received his commission on February 9, 1962. He served as a board member of the Federal Judicial Center from 1973 to 1976. His service terminated on March 1, 1976, due to his resignation.

Role in the 1966 Georgia gubernatorial election
In the aftermath of the disputed 1966 Georgia gubernatorial election between Democrat Lester Maddox and Republican Howard "Bo" Callaway, Bell joined Republican Judge Elbert Tuttle in striking down the Georgia constitutional provision requiring that the legislature chose the governor if no general election candidate receives a majority of the vote. The judges concluded that a malapportioned legislature might "dilute" the votes of the candidate with a plurality, in this case Callaway. Bell compared legislative selection to the former County Unit System, a kind of electoral college formerly used in Georgia to select the governor but invalidated by the U.S. Supreme Court. Bell and Tuttle granted a temporary suspension of their ruling to permit appeal to the U.S. Supreme Court and stipulated that the state could resolve the deadlock so long as the legislature not make the selection. In a five-to-two decision known as Fortson v. Morris, the high court struck down the Bell-Tuttle legal reasoning and directed the legislature to choose between Maddox and Callaway. Two liberal justices, William O. Douglas and Abe Fortas had argued against legislative selection of the governor, but the court majority, led this time by Hugo Black, took the strict constructionist line and cleared the path for Maddox's ultimate election.

Attorney General service

Bell briefly returned to private practice in Atlanta in 1976. President Jimmy Carter appointed Bell Attorney General of the United States in 1977, serving until 1979.

Indictment of L. Patrick Gray
On April 10, 1978, Attorney General Bell announced the indictment of former Acting FBI Director L. Patrick Gray, Mark Felt and former FBI Assistant Director Edward Miller for authorizing break-ins of New York City radical political activists. Bell introduced requirements that any authorized illegal activities must be made in writing. Five Department of Justices attorneys resigned over the alleged reluctance of the Attorney Bell to pursue others in the department for illegal activities related to domestic spying.

Later career

Bell returned to private practice in Atlanta from 1979 until his death in 2009. In September 2004, Bell was appointed the Chief Judge of the United States Court of Military Commission Review. Bell was replaced by Judge Frank J. Williams in July 2007, when the first two cases were appealed to the Court, due to ill health.

Death
Griffin Bell died on January 5, 2009, in Atlanta. According to the Associated Press, Bell was being treated for complications from pancreatic cancer and had been suffering from long-term kidney disease. Governor Sonny Perdue ordered the flag of the United States flown at half-staff in the state of Georgia on January 7, 2009, the day of Bell's funeral. He is buried in Americus' Oak Grove Cemetery, Section N3-South, where his tombstone bears the inscription "Citizen Soldier, Trial Lawyer, Federal Appellate Judge, Attorney General of the United States."

Legacy
Bell had a long-standing relationship with the Georgia Historical Society (GHS). He was a member of the institution for over half a century and from 1996 until his death served as Honorary Chairman of its Advisory Board. In 2008, Bell donated his papers to GHS, where they are available for research. See the finding aid for the Griffin B. Bell papers at the Georgia Historical Society.

Honors and awards
In December 2008, Bell received an honorary Doctor of Humanities degree from Georgia Southwestern State University in recognition of his achievements and appreciation for his efforts to promote the interests of his alma mater.

See also
List of United States political appointments that crossed party lines

References

Sources
 Bell, Griffin B. and Ronald J. Ostrow.Taking Care of the Law  Morrow. 1982. 
 Murphy, Reg, "Uncommon Sense, The Achievement of Griffin Bell," Peachtree Press.

External links
 
 Bell's Mercer Commencement Address
 Georgia Encyclopedia article. 
 
 Griffin B. Bell papers at the Georgia Historical Society

1918 births
2009 deaths
United States Attorneys General
Georgia (U.S. state) lawyers
People from Americus, Georgia
Georgia Southwestern State University alumni
Mercer University alumni
Judges of the United States Court of Appeals for the Fifth Circuit
United States court of appeals judges appointed by John F. Kennedy
20th-century American judges
Guantanamo Bay captives legal and administrative procedures
Deaths from pancreatic cancer
Carter administration cabinet members
20th-century American politicians
Deaths from cancer in Georgia (U.S. state)
United States Army officers
United States Army personnel of World War II
Judges of the United States Court of Military Commission Review